The GC is a New Zealand reality television series that premiered on TV3 on 2 May 2012 in New Zealand. The series follows the lives of a group of Māori living in Gold Coast, Queensland.

The series has been compared to the American reality show The Hills.

Production  

The show was originally pitched as an observational documentary series called Golden Mozzies, described as "looking at seven Māori families living on Australia's Gold Coast". In August 2011, the producers of Golden Mozzies received $419,408 from broadcast funding agency NZ On Air for the production of eight 30 minute episodes. However, the format and title of the series was changed with NZ On Air's knowledge.

In 2013, a second season of The GC was funded by Maori broadcast funding agency Te Māngai Pāho with stricter requirements for Maori language and cultural content. $419,384 was granted for eight 30 minute episodes.

In 2015, it was announced via the shows Facebook page that the show was renewed for a third season, along with new cast members and the show being moved to Four.

The third season premiered in July 2015.

Cast
The show revolves around Tylah Jones Wharehinga, Rosanna Arkle, Zane Houia, Elyse Minhinnick, Braydon McMahon, Holly Subritzky, Cole Smith, Alby Waititi, Nuz Ngatai, Matai Smith, and Matatia Brell. Former cast members include Tame Noema, Jade Louise, Jessie Nugent, Nathan Waikato, Brooke James, and Jade Ruwhiu.

Main

Critical reception
Following the screening of the pilot episode viewers branded the show as "fake" and "pathetic" and within hours a Facebook page called "Cancel the GC TV Show" was started. According to a New Zealand Herald article the Facebook page had over 2100 "likes" within 12 hours of the show's airing.

There have also been questions about the show's funding. Following the screening of the pilot episode it was revealed that NZ on Air gave NZ$419,408 to fund the first series of The GC. According to news website Scoop Independent News, NZ on Air thought they were funding a series about seven Māori families living on the Gold Coast of Australia with the working title Golden Mozzies.

Episodes

Series one

References

2012 New Zealand television series debuts
2015 New Zealand television series endings
English-language television shows
Four (New Zealand TV channel) original programming
New Zealand reality television series
Television shows funded by NZ on Air
Television shows set in Gold Coast, Queensland
Three (TV channel) original programming